The West Lothian Wolves are a basketball club based in West Lothian, Scotland.

History
The club was formed in 2000, with the formation of an under 14 boys team in order to compete in the BAA Millenium Games. This team would go on to compete in at U14, U16 and U18 regional level. Several of these players now turn out for the Senior Men's team at National League level.

The Wolves' first National League team would be an U16 boys team entering for the 2003-04 season, under the guidance of club founder Alan Hastie.

After a few years of steady growth, the senior team won Division 2 of the Lothian League in 2007 after going unbeaten all season. The team therefore achieved promotion to Division 1.

The team continued to post solid performances in Division 1 of the Lothian League, before claiming the league title in 2014. The year after, the team would enter the first full season of the newly reintroduced National League Division 2, where they have remained since.

Home Venues
The club uses various venues across the West Lothian council area.
Bathgate Academy, Bathgate
Inveralmond Community High School, Livingston
St Margaret's Academy, Livingston
Deans Community High School, Livingston
Whitburn Academy, Whitburn
Linlithgow Academy Sports Hall, Linlithgow
James Young High School, Livingston
West Calder High School, Livingston

Honours
Senior Men 
Lothian League Division 2 Champions 2006/07
Lothian League Division 1 Champions 2013/14

Under 16 Boys 
Lothian League Champions 2007/08

Under 16 Girls 
Lothian League Champions 2008/09

Under 14 Girls 
East & Central Regional League Champions 2012/2013

Men's season-by-season records

External links

Basketball teams in Scotland
Bathgate
Sport in West Lothian
2000 establishments in Scotland
Basketball teams established in 2000